Smokie may refer to:

 Smokie (band), an English rock band from Bradford, Yorkshire
 Smokie (food), sheep or goats prepared for food by blowtorching the fleece off the unskinned carcass
 Arbroath smokie, a type of smoked haddock fish
 "Smokie, Part 2", a 1959 instrumental by Bill Black's Combo

See also
 Old Smoky (disambiguation)
 Smokies (disambiguation)
 Smoky (disambiguation)
 Smokey (disambiguation)
 Smoke (disambiguation)